|}

The Dee Stakes is a Listed flat horse race in Great Britain open to three-year-old colts and geldings. It is run over a distance of 1 mile, 2 furlongs and 70 yards at Chester in May.

History
The event is named after the River Dee, which runs alongside the racecourse. It was established in 1813, and was originally open to both colts and fillies.

In the late 19th century, the distance of the Dee Stakes was about 1½ miles. The race was won by Voluptuary, a subsequent Grand National winner, in 1881.

From 1937, the official distance was 1 mile, 4 furlongs and 53 yards. It was cut to 1 mile, 2 furlongs and 10 yards in 1958, and extended by 14 yards in 1970.

The present system of race grading was introduced in 1971, and the Dee Stakes was given Group 3 status. It was increased to 1 mile, 2 furlongs and 85 yards in 1973.

The race was downgraded to Listed level in 1988. Its distance was cut by 10 yards in 1992. It regained Group 3 status in 2003 and was again downgraded to Listed status in 2014.

The Dee Stakes can serve as a trial for the Epsom Derby. The last horse to win both races was Kris Kin in 2003.

Records

Leading jockey since 1960 (5 wins):
 Lester Piggott – Sweet Moss (1964), Averof (1974), Heir Presumptive (1978), Kirtling (1981), Ivano (1982)
 Willie Carson – Laureate (1968), Golden Monad (1970), Natsun (1973), Ravel (1975), Blue Stag (1990)
 Ryan Moore -  Magician (2013), Cliffs of Moher (2017), Rostropovich (2018), Circus Maximus (2019), Star of India (2022) 

Leading trainer since 1960 (11 wins):
 Barry Hills – Golden Monad (1970), Our Mirage (1972), Natsun (1973), Ravel (1975), Two of Diamonds (1979), Infantry (1985), Sir Harry Lewis (1987), Free Sweater (1989), Blue Stag (1990), Prolix (1998), Sohaib (2002)

Winners since 1970

Earlier winners

 1813: Bravo
 1814: Prince of Orange
 1815: Rosabella
 1816: Bustard
 1817: Wirral
 1818: sister to William
 1819: Comet
 1820: Claudius
 1821: Stingo
 1822: colt by Orville
 1823: General Mina
 1824: Portrait
 1825: Autocrat
 1826: Leviathan
 1827: Joceline
 1828: Terror
 1829: Butterfly
 1830: Moss Rose
 1831: Tilcher
 1832: Birdcatcher
 1833: Jack Faucet
 1834: Touchstone
 1835: Peter Simple
 1836: Trap-Ball
 1837: Pammon
 1838: Sir Ralph
 1839: Apothecary
 1840: The Shah
 1841: Satirist
 1842: Combermere
 1843: General Pollock
 1844: The Cure
 1845:
 1846: Fancy Boy
 1847: The Swallow
 1848: Flatcatcher
 1849: Elthiron
 1850: The Bee-Hunter
 1851: Hippolytus
 1852: Attack
 1853: Orinoco
 1854: Scythian
 1855: Noisy
 1856: Bird in Hand
 1857: Strathnaver
 1858: East Langton
 1859: Actaeon
 1860: Northern Light
 1861: Starlight
 1862: Costa
 1863: Borealis
 1864: Greville
 1865: Broomielaw
 1866: Bertie
 1867: Van Amburgh
 1868: Uncas
 1869: Whinyard
 1870: Bonny Swell
 1871: The Knight
 1872: Malahide
 1873: Master John
 1874: De Cambis
 1875: Perkin Warbeck
 1876: Advance
 1877: Bonnie Robin
 1878: Red Archer
 1879: Sunburn
 1880: Toastmaster
 1881: Voluptuary
 1882: Whipper-In
 1883: John Jones
 1884: Newton
 1885: Metal
 1886: Coracle
 1887: Savile 
 1888: Toscano
 1889: Davenport
 1890: Sainfoin
 1891: Sarawak
 1892: Haymaker
 1893: Ali
 1894: Alfragan
 1895: Oleander
 1896: Nouveau Riche
 1897: Prime Minister / Silver Fox 
 1898: Schonberg
 1899: Trident
 1900: Lumley Moor
 1901: Sir Edgar
 1902: Throwaway
 1903: Gilbert Orme
 1904: Islesman
 1905: Chuckaway
 1906: Troutbeck
 1907: Wool Winder
 1908: Abbot's Abode
 1909: Great Peter
 1910: Glazebrook
 1911: St Girons
 1912: Maritza
 1913: The Curragh
 1914: Conqueror
 1915: Achtoi
 1916–18: no race
 1919: Silonyx
 1920: Paladin
 1921: no race
 1922: Fred Power
 1923: Roger de Busli
 1924: Battleship
 1925: Runnymede
 1926: no race
 1927: Royal Pom
 1928: Ranjit Singh
 1929: Free Forester
 1930: Master Mint
 1931: Mangosteen
 1932: Yellowstone
 1933: Highlander
 1934: Alishah
 1935: Pry II
 1936: Noble King
 1937: Sunbather
 1938: Pactolus
 1939: Triguero
 1940–45: no race
 1946: Neapolitan
 1947: Maray
 1948: King's Acre
 1949: Father Thames
 1950: Khorassan
 1951: Sybil's Nephew
 1952: Torcross
 1953: Victory Roll
 1954: Cloonroughan
 1955: Tippecanoe
 1956: Atlas
 1957: Palor
 1958: Pandour
 1959: Parthia
 1960: Alcaeus
 1961: Oakville
 1962: Persian Wonder
 1963: My Myosotis
 1964: Sweet Moss
 1965: Look Sharp
 1966: Grey Moss
 1967: French Vine
 1968: Laureate
 1969: no race

See also
 Horse racing in Great Britain
 List of British flat horse races

References

 Paris-Turf:
 Racing Post:

 galopp-sieger.de – Dee Stakes.
 horseracingintfed.com – International Federation of Horseracing Authorities – Dee Stakes (2012).
 pedigreequery.com – Dee Stakes – Chester.

Flat horse races for three-year-olds
Chester Racecourse
Flat races in Great Britain
1813 establishments in England
Recurring sporting events established in 1813